Taer may refer to:

 Taer (Dungeons & Dragons), a fictional monster
 Ta'er Temple, a Tibetan gompa in Qinghai, China
 Ta'er Temple (Suoyang City), a ruined Buddhist temple in Gansu, China
 Taer 2, an Iranian missile
 TAER Andalus, a former airline

See also 
 Tair (disambiguation)
 Taher